"The Hardest Part Is the Night" is a single by American rock band Bon Jovi released exclusively in the UK. It is taken from their second album, 7800° Fahrenheit. It is notable for being the first Bon Jovi single to reach the top 100 in the UK, where it charted at number 68.

Overview
Among Bon Jovi's early songs, "The Hardest Part is the Night" is the one that expresses most clearly Jon Bon Jovi's concerns with working class issues and the struggles of the underdog, a theme that would later bring success to the band with "Livin' on a Prayer". The song makes vague references to a young man battling against the odds to succeed in life, though he knows that he is ultimately "going down".

The promotional video was an excerpt from a live performance in Japan and was directed by Sadao Matsunago for Spirit Entertainment, Ltd.

Chart performance

References

Bon Jovi songs
1985 songs
Songs written by Jon Bon Jovi
Songs written by Richie Sambora
Songs written by David Bryan
PolyGram singles